John Roberts served his third and final year on the United States Court of Appeals for the District of Columbia Circuit in 2005. He was nominated to the Supreme Court of the United States by President George W. Bush originally on July 19 for the seat being vacated by Justice Sandra Day O'Connor's retirement and later nominated on September 5 to be Chief Justice of the United States after William Rehnquist's death two days prior. He was confirmed by the United States Senate on September 29 and left the circuit bench. He was succeeded on the D.C. Circuit by Patricia Millett. The following are opinions written by Judge Roberts in 2005.

References

Case law lists by judge